Pseudathyma cyrili is a butterfly in the family Nymphalidae. It is found in Cameroon, the Central African Republic, the Republic of the Congo, the Democratic Republic of the Congo, Uganda and Tanzania.

References

Butterflies described in 2002
Pseudathyma